Mirabbas Geogja Gasimov (11 July 1939 – 6 September 2008) was a mathematician of the Soviet Union and Azerbaijan, doctor of physics-mathematics, professor, an active member of Academy of Sciences of Azerbaijan.

Biography 
Mirabbas Gasimov was born in Narimankend village (now Gobustan city) of Shamakhy in 1939. In 1956, Gasimov had entered the faculty of physics-mathematics of Azerbaijan State University (now Baku State University). In 1958, he was transferred to the appropriate faculty of M. V. Lomonosov Moscow State University. In 1961, after graduating from his education, he was kept in post-graduate courses of MSU. From this period, M. Gasimov's scientific work was beginning (his research adviser had become F. A. Berezin) and mainly it consisted from B. M. Levitan's investigation which he thought him as himself teacher. B. Levitan gave high value to Mirabbas Gasimov's works in one's turn, he approached lovingly him like himself most talented student.

Scientific work 
Mirabbas Gasimov's main works had belonged to obstinate problems of spectral analysis and theory of non-selfadjoint differential operators for classes of different differential operator.

In 1964, M. G. Gasimov defended master's thesis of "Definition of Sturm–Liouville differential equation with respect to two spectra in Academic Council of the faculty of Mechanics-Mathematics of MSU. Work had been estimated as "Spectacular Work" according to special decision of Academic Council. In the same year, he went to work as an assistant to Moscow Physical Technical Institute and in 1965, he was assigned as a senior lecturer to the Department Mathematics of F. E. Dzerzhinskiy Military Engineering Academy with competition way.

In 1967, M. Gasimov defended thesis for doctor's degree according physics-mathematics sciences in theme of "Some problems of theory of selfadjoint and non-selfadjoint differential operators in MSU" and this dissertation was translated into English in United States. Famous mathematicians, A. Q. Kostyuchenko, V. A. Marchenko, M. A. Naymark had been official opponents. From September 1968 he had become professor position of ASU. From 1972 (until 2007) he had become the chief of chair of Applied Mathematics. In 1970–76, he became the head of Department Partial Differential Equations in the Institute of Mathematics and Mechanics of the Academy of Sciences of Azerbaijan.

In 1980, M. Gasimov was elected a corresponding member of the Academy of Sciences of Azerbaijan, in 1989, he became an active member (academician) of Academy of Sciences of Azerbaijan.

In 1990–92, he became the rector of BSU. In this period, attached to the university Applied Mathematic Scientific Experience Institute was created, and as main purpose he aimed to bring together mathematicians and mechanics. In different years, he held the posts of the dean of Mechanics Math and Applied Mathematics and Cybernatics of BSU, and the first deputy minister of education. In 1990–95, he became the deputy of the Supreme Soviet of Republic of Azerbaijan.

M. Gasimov had become honorary doctor of Egey-Izmir and Selcuk-Konya University of Turkey.

Contribution to science 
M. Gasimov was considered the founder of modern math school of Azerbaijan. He had guided scientific works of several mathematicians and he had paid attention to bring up high level scientific stafves. Mirabbas Gasimov's held seminars of " Functional analysis and its additions " and " The spectral theory of differential operators were regarded important event in life of math of Baku in every time. About 70 thesises for Doctor's degree and master's were defended under his supervisor. Hamlet Isayev (Hamlet Isakhanli), prominent mathematician, science and culture historian, poet, and founder of Khazar University was among mathematicians inspried by Mirabbas Gasimov. Gasimov was engaged in great scientific works in arrangement and development of the faculty of Applied Mathematics of Baku State University.

For his merits in the development of Azerbaijani science Gasimov was regarded with gold medal by M. V. Keldysh Federation of SSRI Astronomtics.

Gasimov had been the opponent of more than 60 theses for a Doctor's degree and master's in different cities of SSRI. He became participant of three International Mathematic Congresses (Moscow – 1966, France – 1970, Canada – 1974). In Warsaw, he had performed with series of lectures in S. Banach International Math Center.

M. G. Gasimov had published about 100 scientific papers, and the great part of these were printed in authoritative central journals of past SSRI ("ДАН СССР", "Успехи математических наук", "Математический сборник", "Известия АН СССР", "Труды Московского Математического общества", "Функциональный анализ и его приложения", "Математические заметки", "Дифференциальные уравнения", "Сибирский математический журнал", "ДАН АзССР", "Известия АН АзССР", conferences of All Union and works of schools, etc.). Gasimov's scientific results were made notes in Department of Mathematics of SSRI AS and account of academician secretary of SSRI AS between most important works in many times. His articles were considered one of the most base uponed mathematical works. He had translated a number of valuable scientific works to Russian language and he had become one of translator of famous books in three volumes of " Linear operators " of N. Danford and C. Shvars, also he had published several popular mathematical articles.

M. G. Gasimov died on September 6, 2008, in Baku and was buried in birthplace village of Narimankend according to his own testament.

References

1939 births
2008 deaths